Tonsala is an extinct genus of Plotopteridae, a family of flightless seabird similar in biology with penguins, but more closely related to modern cormorants. The genus is known from terrains dated from the Late Oligocene of the State of Washington.

History and etymology

In 1979, Storrs L. Olson and Hasegawa Yoshikazu identified several fossilized specimens of Late Oligocene and Early Miocene birds found in the State of Washington and in Japan as members of the family Plotopteridae, but distinct enough from Plotopterum in their general anatomy to warrant their own genus. The Washington fossils, collected by Douglas Emlong in Late Oligocene terrains of the Pysht Formation, in the north of the Olympic Peninsula, were formally described the next year, 1980, by Olson himself, as the type of the new genus and species Tonsala hildegardae. Olson ascribed to the genus the holotype USNM 256518, an incomplete specimen comprising a fragmentary humerus, fragments of a distal wing, a patella and a pectoral girdle.

The genus name, Tonsala, is constructed with the Latin prefix "Tonsa-", meaning "oar", and the suffix "-ala", meaning wing, referencing the adaptation of its forelimbs as a swimming apparatus ; the species name, hildegardae, was given to honour Hildegarde Howard, the American paleontologist who described Plotopterum.

Description

Tonsala was a very large and flightless seabird, comparable in size with a great penguin, and larger than its later relative Plotopterum. 
The genus was heavily adapted towards swimming and diving ; the wings were paddle-shaped, and the scapula had a thin and expanded blade, similar to that of penguins, to help the animal propel through water. The structure of the wing, and notably the shape of the humerus and radius, shared more resemblances with early penguins and flightless auks like Pinguinus and Mancalla than with the related Pelecaniformes, in a case of convergent evolution. The appearance of the ulnare also indicates the relatively low flexibility of the distal region of the wings. However, the genus retains some pelecaniform characteristics, such as an elongated acromion on the scapula, although thinner than its modern relatives, and the distinctive plotopterid coracoid was similar to those of gannets, while the ossified patella, only element known about the hindlimbs of the genus, was more reminiscent of darters.
Aside of its larger size, it is differentiated from Plotopterum through the more elongated glenoid facet, the lack of sinuation on the sternal margin, the projection of the furcular facet and the long and narrow coracohumeral surface.

References

Fossil taxa described in 1980
Paleogene Japan
Plotopteridae
Extinct flightless birds
Prehistoric bird genera